Ridgely is a town in Caroline County, Maryland, United States. The population was 1,639 at the 2010 census.

History
The town was established on May 13, 1867 by the Maryland and Baltimore Land Association. The land around present day Ridgely was purchased by the Maryland and Baltimore Land Association from Thomas Bell and the Reverend Greenbury W. Ridgely. The town was named after the Rev. Greenbury W. Ridgely.

A railroad boom in the 1860s on the Delmarva Peninsula was fueling land speculation. Civil engineer J.J. Sickler from Philadelphia was commissioned to design the town's layout. The Land Association began construction and built four buildings, including a railroad station, hotel, and two private residences during the first year. James K. Saulsbury constructed a combined store and residence, now known as the Ridgely House.

During the Land's Association's first year, it went bankrupt; Ridgely was left unfinished and sparsely populated. Most properties were sold at public auction, and Ridgely began to grow gradually as a result of its location on the railroad line now called the Maryland and Delaware.

Ridgely's economy flourished as a result of its local crop production, including strawberries, huckleberries, vegetables, eggs, and poultry.  Most crops were processed in Ridgely or sent to various locations on the railroad.  As the nation began to rely on highways instead of railroads for transportation and industry began to concentrate in larger urban areas, Ridgely's economy declined.

Ridgely became known as the "Strawberry Capital of the World" as a result of its prosperous agricultural business.  Every May, Ridgely hosts the Strawberry Festival to celebrate its past. A Ridgely Historical Society was created in 2005 for the same purpose.

Geography
Ridgely is located at  (38.944896, -75.883489).

Demographics

2010 census
As of the census of 2010, there were 1,639 people, 604 households, and 412 families residing in the town. The racial makeup of the town was 77.1% White, 16.3% African American, 0.9% Native American, 0.2% Asian, 2.5% from other races, and 3.1% from two or more races. Hispanic or Latino of any race were 5.9% of the population.

There were 604 households, of which 44.7% had children under the age of 18 living with them, 46.9% were married couples living together, 16.1% had a female householder with no husband present, 5.3% had a male householder with no wife present, and 31.8% were non-families. 27.2% of all households were made up of individuals, and 9.8% had someone living alone who was 65 years of age or older. The average household size was 2.71 and the average family size was 3.26.

The median age in the town was 32 years. 30.9% of residents were under the age of 18; 6.9% were between the ages of 18 and 24; 30.4% were from 25 to 44; 22.9% were from 45 to 64; and 8.9% were 65 years of age or older. The gender makeup of the town was 47.0% male and 53.0% female.

2000 census
As of the census of 2000, there were 1,352 people, 513 households, and 349 families residing in the town. The racial makeup of the town was 81.58% White, 15.61% African American, 0.22% Native American, 0.59% Asian, 0.96% from other races, and 1.04% from two or more races. Hispanic or Latino of any race were 3.18% of the population.

There were 513 households, out of which 39.6% had children under the age of 18 living with them, 49.5% were married couples living together, 15.0% had a female householder with no husband present, and 31.8% were non-families. 26.9% of all households were made up of individuals, and 10.7% had someone living alone who was 65 years of age or older. The average household size was 2.63 and the average family size was 3.21.

In the town, the age distribution of the population shows 30.4% under the age of 18, 8.1% from 18 to 24, 31.1% from 25 to 44, 19.6% from 45 to 64, and 10.8% who were 65 years of age or older. The median age was 33 years. For every 100 females, there were 89.6 males. For every 100 females age 18 and over, there were 87.1 males.

The median income for a household in the town was $35,750, and the median income for a family was $38,929. Males had a median income of $27,356 versus $19,844 for females. The per capita income for the town was $15,581. About 7.8% of families and 11.3% of the population were below the poverty line, including 12.4% of those under age 18 and 14.6% of those age 65 or over.

Arts and culture

Historic places
Oak Lawn was listed on the National Register of Historic Places in 1975. Marble Head was listed in 2002.

Points of interest
 Adkins Arboretum
 Tuckahoe State Park

Strawberry Festival
Ridgelyites boast of the widest main street of any town in Maryland; it was once considered "The Strawberry Capital" and still holds a Strawberry Festival each May.

Government

Town Officials and Staff
Commissioners: Anthony Casey, John Hurley, and Leonard John Buckle
Clerk-Treasurer:  Stephanie Berkey
Assistant Clerk:  Melissa Leonard
Zoning Administrator:  Melissa Leonard
Director of Public Works:  David Crist
Chief of Police: Jeff Eckrich

Infrastructure

Transportation
Transportation to and from Ridgely is primarily by road, and three state highways serve the town. These include Maryland Route 312, which is signed north-south but has an alignment closer to north-northeast by south-southwest, and Maryland Route 480, which is signed east-west but has an alignment closer to east-northeast by west-southwest. Maryland Route 776 also traverses Ridgely, serving as a local connector.

The Ridgely Airpark serves the area also.

Postal service
The main ZIP code for Ridgely is 21660, but is assigned eight other "216" zip codes due to its status as a home to fulfillment companies that receive and ship mail-in offers.

Notable people
 Buck Herzog, a former major league baseball player with the New York Giants, Boston Braves, Cincinnati Reds, and Chicago Cubs from 1908 to 1920.
 Baseball Hall of Famer Jimmie Foxx began his career here as a semipro catcher. Another Hall of Famer, Home Run Baker, played for the town team as well.
 The town was home to former Maryland Congressman Thomas Alexander Smith.

References

External links

 

Towns in Maryland
Towns in Caroline County, Maryland